The British Safety Council, a registered charity founded by James Tye in 1957, is one of the world's leading health and safety organisations alongside the likes of Institution of Occupational Safety and Health and International Institute of Risk & Safety Management.

The British Safety Council covers a variety of health and safety issues such as occupational health and safety, construction health and safety, environmental sustainability, COSHH, risk assessment, fire safety and environmental management.

Unlike these the council's members are mostly companies. Safety practitioners the world over use the services and training they provide. The London-based charity provides training in over 50 countries.

The British Safety Council is also a partner in the development of the Occupational Safety and Health Consultants Register scheme (OSHCR), a centrally held register of registered health and safety consultants within the United Kingdom.

The British Safety Council as a government awarding body

The British Safety Council is a government-regulated awarding body that complies with a wide range of conditions set by the regulator so that rigor and consistency in the awarding of qualifications is maintained.

They are a UK awarding body that provide a complete suite of health and safety qualifications from Entry Level to Level 6 in the national framework.
 They provide qualifications from international organizations, including NEBOSH, IEMA and IOSH.

References

External links

Safety organizations
Charities based in London
1957 establishments in the United Kingdom
Organizations established in 1957
Health and safety in the United Kingdom